Lake Shore Electric Railway may refer to:
Lake Shore Electric Railway an interurban railway along Lake Erie
Lake Shore Electric Railway (museum) in Ohio (2005-2009)
Lake Shore Electric Railway (California) in Elsinore